Marc Jousset was a French sailor who represented his country at the 1900 Summer Olympics in Meulan, France. Marc Jousset as helmsman, took the 9th place in first race of the 0.5 to 1 ton and did not start in the second race. He did this with the boat Dick.

Further reading

References

External links

French male sailors (sport)
Sailors at the 1900 Summer Olympics – .5 to 1 ton
Olympic sailors of France
Year of birth missing
Year of death missing
Place of birth missing
Place of death missing